Stuart or Stewart Campbell may refer to:

Sports
Stewart Campbell (rugby union) (born 1972), Scottish rugby union player
Stuart Campbell (footballer) (born 1977), English-born Scottish football coach and former player

Writers, musicians and actors
Steuart Campbell (born 1937), British writer
Stewart Campbell, musician in The Zephyrs
Stuart Campbell (game journalist), British video game designer and journalist
Stuart Campbell (journalist) (1908–1966), British newspaper editor

Others
Stewart Campbell (politician) (1812–1885), Canadian lawyer and politician
Stuart James Campbell, British man convicted of murder
Stuart Campbell (obstetrician), pioneer in the use of ultrasound in obstetrics
W. Stewart Campbell (?–2009), American production designer and art director